Talsinki (sometimes also Hellinna or Hellinn) is a colloquial name for the geographical region of Helsinki, Finland and Tallinn, Estonia, separated by the Gulf of Finland, commonly used when referring to the proposed Helsinki–Tallinn Tunnel. The official Euroregion name for the region is Helsinki–Tallinn Euregion.

See also
 Helsinki to Tallinn Tunnel
 Estonian–Finnish federation

References

External links
 'Talsinki' – a 21st century metropolis

Culture in Helsinki
Tourism in Helsinki
Transport in Helsinki
Geography of Helsinki
Culture in Tallinn
Geography of Tallinn
Twin cities
Euroregions